The Düden River (- Katarraktes) is a river of southern Anatolia, Turkey, the lower reaches of which traverse Düden Waterfalls, and enters the Mediterranean Sea east of Antalya.

Anciently, it was a major river of Pamphylia. Pomponius Mela describes its ancient names as being so called because it has a great fall or cataract. He places the town of Perga between the Cestrus and the Catarrhactes. The Stadiasmus describes it by the term οἱ Καταρράκται, or "the Falls". Strabo also speaks of this river as falling over a high rock.

This river, on approaching the coast, divides into several branches, which, falling over the cliffs that border this part of the coast, have formed a calcareous deposit. Through this calcareous crust the water finds its way to the sea, and the river has now no determinate outlet, unless, adds Leake, it be after heavy rains, when, it precipitates itself copiously over the cliffs near the most projecting point of the coast, a little to the west of Laara. According to the Stadiasmus the outlet of the river was at a place called Masura, probably the Magydus of Ptolemy or the Mygdale of the Stadiasmus may be Magydus.

The Düden River runs underground in one part of its course, which appears to be of considerable length.

References

Rivers of Turkey
Landforms of Antalya Province
Pamphylia